At the 1972 Summer Olympics in Munich, eight events in fencing were contested. Men competed in both individual and team events for each of the three weapon types (épée, foil and sabre), but women competed only in foil events.

Medal summary

Men's events

Women's events

Medal table

Participating nations
A total of 298 fencers (233 men and 65 women) from 37 nations competed at the Munich Games:

See also
 David Dushman

References

External links
Official Olympic Report

 
1972
1972 Summer Olympics events
1972 in fencing
International fencing competitions hosted by Germany